The Cathedral of St. Lawrence is a cathedral of the Roman Catholic Church in the city of San Lorenzo, Paraguay dating from the early twentieth century, although its completion took circa 50 years. It is the seat of the Catholic diocese of San Lorenzo (Dioecesis Sancti Laurentii), which Pope John Paul II instituted by the Papal bull  Magno perfundimur  of 2000.

It is located in the city center, surrounded by beautiful squares, plazas, and pedestrian streets. The cathedral and squares occupy an entire city block bordered by the streets Gaspar Rodriguez de Francia, San Lorenzo, Coronel Romero, and the Defensores del Chaco avenue. It is considered by many a magnificent religious building because its style is unique in the Republic of Paraguay.

See also
Roman Catholicism in Paraguay

References

Roman Catholic cathedrals in Paraguay
Roman Catholic churches completed in 1968
20th-century Roman Catholic church buildings in Paraguay